Felix du Pont may refer to:
A. Felix du Pont
A. Felix du Pont, Jr.